Mount Henderson is a prominent mountain. It was discovered and named by the British National Antarctic Expedition, 1901–04.

References

Mountains of Oates Land
Britannia Range (Antarctica)